Alexandre Lavoie (born November 17, 1992) is a Canadian professional ice hockey player. He is currently playing with Mora IK of the HockeyAllsvenskan (Allsv).

Playing career
Lavoie started playing in Chicoutimi Saguenéens in the Quebec Major Junior Hockey League (QMJHL) from 2008 to 2011 followed by a season in the same league's Cape Breton Screaming Eagles and one more season in the league's Rimouski Oceanic.

He then moved to play on the Allen Americans in the Central Hockey League (CHL) for two seasons including a loan assignment to American Hockey League club, the Oklahoma City Barons. Lavoie was voted Best of the "Best Rookie of the Year" in 2014. After 7 games with the Barons, he returned to the Allen Americans to help capture the Ray Miron Cup.

On August 1, 2014, Lavoie opted to move to the ECHL, signing a one-year deal with the Florida Everblades. In the 2014–15 season, Lavoie was the main offensive threat for the Everblades, registering 57 points in 67 games.

On September 23, 2015, Lavoie's rights were traded to the Indy Fuel. He signed a one-year contract with the club to remain in the ECHL. In 71 games with the Fuel, Lavoie was amongst the team's offensive leaders with 38 assists and 54 points.

As a free agent in the following off-season, Lavoie opted to sign abroad in Sweden, agreeing to a one-year deal with second-tier club, BIK Karlskoga of the HockeyAllsvenskan on August 24, 2016.

After four European seasons, Lavoie opted to return to North America during the COVID-19 pandemic, he agreed to a contract to resume his career in the ECHL with former club, the Allen Americans on November 4, 2020. He added 6 assists through 12 games in the 2020–21 season before ending his contract after securing a contract in Sweden with second-tier club, HC Vita Hästen of the Allsvenskan on January 26, 2021.

Awards and honours

References

External links

1992 births
Living people
Allen Americans players
Canadian ice hockey centres
Cape Breton Screaming Eagles players
Chicoutimi Saguenéens (QMJHL) players
Florida Everblades players
French Quebecers
Frisk Asker Ishockey players
Indy Fuel players
KalPa players
Oklahoma City Barons players
People from Anjou, Quebec
Quebec Amateur Athletic Association players
Rimouski Océanic players
Ice hockey people from Montreal
Timrå IK players
HC TWK Innsbruck players
HC Vita Hästen players